The Dr. Samuel D. Harris National Museum of Dentistry – located in Baltimore, Maryland, and opened in 1996 – preserves and exhibits the history of dentistry in United States and throughout the world. Situated on the campus of the University of Maryland, Baltimore, home of the nation's first dental school, The Baltimore College of Dental Surgery, it exhibits numerous artifacts concerning dentistry throughout the ages as well as exhibits on oral health and dentistry professionals. Highlights of the collection include George Washington's dentures, Queen Victoria's dental instruments, and the world's only tooth jukebox.

The museum has also been honored by receiving congressional designation as the nation's official dental museum (2003) and is an affiliate of the Smithsonian Institution.

References

External links
 The Dr. Samuel D. Harris National Museum of Dentistry

Museums in Baltimore
Medical museums in Maryland
Museums established in 1996
Dentistry
Dental museums
1996 establishments in Maryland
Downtown Baltimore
Dentistry
Dentistry